P. nigra may refer to:

Animals
 Penelopina nigra, the Highland guan, a bird species
 Petrotilapia nigra, a fish species
 Phelsuma v-nigra v-nigra, a small diurnal subspecies of geckos
 Phylidonyris nigra, a bird species that inhabits the east coast and the south-west corner of Australia
 Pomarea nigra, the Tahiti monarch, a bird species
 Porzana nigra, an extinct bird species

Plants
 Phyllostachys nigra, a bamboo species
 Pinus nigra, a variable species of pine, occurring across southern Europe from Spain to the Crimea, and also in Asia Minor, Cyprus and locally in the Atlas Mountains of northwest Africa
 Populus nigra, the black poplar, a tree species
 Prosopis nigra, a South American leguminous tree species that inhabits the Gran Chaco ecoregion in Argentina and Paraguay
 Prunus nigra, a tree species native to eastern North America from New Brunswick west to southeastern Manitoba and south to Connecticut across to Iowa

See also
 Nigra (disambiguation)